Epilobium minutum is a species of willowherb known by the common names little willowherb, chaparral willowherb and desert willowherb. It is also called "smallflower willowherb" in reference to its small size relatively. However that name, in particular the British English variant "small-flowered willowherb", typically refers to Epilobium parviflorum.

This annual wildflower is native to western North America from British Columbia and Alberta to California and Arizona. This is a plant of fields and meadows, including vernal pools, and it is one of the first flowers to spring up in areas recently cleared by wildfire.

Description
The stems are topped with few tiny white to light purple flowers with notched petals each a few millimeters long. The fruit is a capsule  in length. It is a much smaller plant than most members of the genus, referenced by both the specific name minutum as well as some of its common names.

References

External links

Jepson Manual Treatment - Epilobium minutum
Epilobium minutum - U.C. Photo gallery

minutum
Flora of Western Canada
Flora of the Northwestern United States
Flora of Arizona
Flora of Nevada
Flora of Oregon
Flora of the Sierra Nevada (United States)
Flora of California
Flora without expected TNC conservation status